Dobo-Yonkhor is a rural locality (an ulus) in Zaigrayevsky District, Republic of Buryatia, Russia. The population was 122 as of 2010. There are 5 streets.

Geography 
Dobo-Yonkhor is located 33 km north of Zaigrayevo (the district's administrative centre) by road. Stary Onokhoy is the nearest rural locality.

References 

Rural localities in Zaigrayevsky District